The Committee of Her Imperial Highness the Grand Duchess Tatiana Nikolaevna for the Temporary Relief of Victims of War, commonly known simply as the Tatiana Committee, was a war-refugee relief organization during World War I in the Russian Empire. Organized in September 1914 and named after Grand Duchess Tatiana Nikolaevna, daughter of Emperor Nicholas II of Russia, the committee provided aid (food, clothing, shelter, etc.) to refugees and others affected by the war, organized schools and hospitals, provided grants to other charitable organizations. It was the central refugee relief organizations in Russia until the establishment of the Special Council of Refugees on 30 August 1915. The Tatiana Committee was reorganized after the February Revolution in 1917 – it dropped Tatiana's name, announced elections to key posts, allowed refugees to represent themselves. The reorganized committee was known as the All-Russian Committee to Assist Victims of War. Deprived of its semi-official government status and state funding, the committee diminished significantly.

Establishment and funding
Established on 14 September 1914 by an imperial decree, the committee took its name from Grand Duchess Tatiana Nikolaevna, the 17-year-old daughter of Emperor Nicholas II of Russia. The committee included 28 dignitaries from the Imperial Court and the State Council. It was chaired by state councilor . Tatiana Nikolaevna was not just a patron of the committee, but also a participant – she attended meetings and dealt with paperwork. The committee was initially funded by 900,000 rubles from Emperor's personal funds. It received further funding from the state – about 14 million rubles between July 1915 and 1 May 1917. It also raised money from donations, charity balls, raffles, auctions, and other fundraising initiatives such as selling postcards with Tatiana's image. For example, during the celebrations of Tatiana's birthday on 29–31 May 1915, the committee raised 2.2 million rubles. The committee's employees took no salary.

Activities
Initially, the committee focused on helping war widows and soldiers' children, but it switched to assisting war refugees by the summer of 1915, providing them with food, clothes, and shelter. Newly arriving refugees were met at railway stations, registered, given food stamps and temporary shelter for 5–10 days, and then dispersed in provincial towns and villages. Other activities included reuniting separated families, establishing orphanages, schools, and hospitals, providing aid to non-refugees who had nevertheless suffered from the war, and providing grants to other local war-aid organizations. The Tatiana Committee established numerous local branches: 66 at the provincial level and 220 at the uyezd and volost level by October 1915. 

While the committee faced criticism that it was an establishment of the imperial regime, it undertook some novel initiatives to help the refugees. At the end of 1916, the committee distributed a detailed questionnaire soliciting feedback from the refugees. In spring 1917, it organized an exhibition of refugee handicraft in Petrograd to showcase that they were hardworking people, demonstrate and appreciate cultural differences, and tell stories of refugee plight. The committee also helped refugees fleeing the Armenian, Greek, and Assyrian genocides in the Ottoman Empire.

In its mission the committee competed with the All-Russian Union of Towns (VSG) and the All-Russian Zemstvo Union (VZS). While they shared the same humanitarian goals, there were political tensions between the organizations, particularly when it came to registering refugees and gathering national statistics. The VSG and VZS, based on local self-government institutions of city dumas and zemstvos, were well suited for this task, but the central government did not trust them and delegated the task to the Tatiana Committee. By spring 1916, it counted more than 3.3 million refugees.

References

Refugee aid organizations
Russian Empire in World War I
Organizations based in the Russian Empire
1914 establishments in the Russian Empire
Organizations established in 1914
1917 disestablishments in Russia
Organizations disestablished in 1917